Debs is a small town in Beltrami County, Minnesota. In 2011 it had an estimated population of three. It is named after Eugene V. Debs, an American labor organizer, socialist leader, and presidential candidate of the Socialist Party of America. Debs Consolidated School held classes in the community from 1916 to 1940 and has been listed on the National Register of Historic Places.

References

External links
Debs (Beltrami County, Minnesota): Community Profile

Beltrami County, Minnesota